Daniel de los Reyes (born July 18, 1962) is an American percussionist
who is a former member of Earth, Wind & Fire and Chicago.  He is currently a member of the Zac Brown Band.

Musical career
De los Reyes was born in New York City and raised in Puerto Rico and Las Vegas.  He is of Cuban and Puerto Rican descent. He received early drum instruction from his father, Walfredo Reyes, Sr. His grandfather, Walfredo de los Reyes II, was one of the founding members of the Cuban orchestra Casino de la Playa. He is also an alumnus of Valley High School in the Las Vegas town of Winchester.

De los Reyes's first work as a drummer was for actor and singer Ben Vereen. In 1997, he played on Steve Winwood's album Junction Seven and Yanni's live recording Tribute; performed with Ricky Martin at the 1999 and 2000 Grammy Awards; and played on Philip Bailey's 2002 LP Soul on Jazz. He appeared on Earth, Wind & Fire's album The Promise (2003), on Devoted Spirits: A Tribute to Earth Wind and Fire (2004), and on the Jimi Hendrix tribute album Power of Soul (2004).

He appeared at a 2004 benefit show in honour of late Billboard magazine editor Timothy White, where he performed alongside Don Henley, Sting, Billy Joel, Jimmy Buffett, Roger Waters, Sheryl Crow, James Taylor, Brian Wilson and Jennifer Lopez.
Reyes was featured on Peter Frampton's LP Fingerprints (2006), The Killers album Day & Age (2008), and Brandon Flowers's debut album Flamingo (2010).

He became a member of country music group the Zac Brown Band in 2012, with whom he was nominated for two Grammy Awards, winning one.
He appeared as a guest on Chicago's 2018 tour.

Other acts
De los Reyes has appeared with artists including Justo Almario, Gabriela Anders, India.Arie, Lindsey Buckingham, Vikki Carr, Cher and Sheena Easton, Gloria Estefan, Lola Falana, David Foster,
Aretha Franklin, Josh Groban,
Faith Hill, Chris Isaak, Patti LaBelle, Ronnie Laws, John Mayer,
Tim McGraw, Sérgio Mendes, Wayne Newton
Stevie Nicks and Don Omar, Donny Osmond, Diana Ross, Lionel Richie
José Luis Rodríguez,
Jon Secada, Shakira and Donna Summer.

His entertainment company, DrumJungle, Inc., produces the "Rhythm Evolution!" show. He is the inventor of the "Practice Pro Pad" and LP "One Shot Shaker" musical devices.

Personal life
De los Reyes currently resides in Fayetteville, GA.  He is the older brother of actor Kamar de los Reyes.

Television appearances
Grammy Awards with Don Omar (2005)
Urban Latino with Walfredo Reyes, Jr. and Kamar de los Reyes (April 2004)
2004 Grammy Awards with Earth, Wind & Fire
The Way She Moves - VH1 original movie (2001)
Saturday Night Live with Don Henley
Bette with Bette Midler (November 2000)
A & E Live Inside Job with Don Henley (2000)
Saturday Night Live with Jennifer Lopez (2000)
1999 Women's World Cup with Jennifer Lopez 
American Music Awards with Kenny Ortega
American Music Awards with Gloria Estefan and Miami Sound Machine
American Music Awards with Diana Ross
American Music Awards with Lionel Richie
Rick Dees with Gerardo
Amigos Adelante—Budweiser
Steve Winwood -- "Don't You Know What the Night Can Do?" (Adrien Lyons)
One Life to Live

Videography
Inside Job with Don Henley
Feelin' So Good with Jennifer Lopez
The Ricky Martin Video Collection with Ricky Martin
Tribute with Yanni
Yanni Live at Royal Albert Hall with Yanni
Yanni, Live from Toji Temple with Yanni
Cuando Pasara with Rob Rosa
We All Sleep Alone with Cher

Discography
(2001) San Rafael 500

References

External links
Bio at Drummerworld.com
Bio at LatinJazzClub.com
Bio at Congahead.com
Official Zac Brown Band Website

American percussionists
Living people
Earth, Wind & Fire members
Zac Brown Band members
1962 births
Chicago (band) members
20th-century American drummers
American male drummers